Roy Cameron may refer to:
 Sir Roy Cameron (pathologist), Australian pathologist
 Sir Roy Cameron (police officer), Scottish police officer
 Roy Cameron (statistician), Australian public servant and diplomat